Brahe Basket is a basketball club in Huskvarna, Sweden. The club was established in 1976. and has played in the Swedish top division on both the men's and the women's sides. The women's team lost the Swedish national championship playoff finals in the season of 2003-2004, losing to the Solna Vikings.

References

External links
official website 

1976 establishments in Sweden
Basketball teams established in 1976
Basketball teams in Sweden
Sport in Huskvarna